Tungokochen is a rural locality in Tungokochensky District of Zabaykalsky Krai, Russia. Population:

Geography
The village is about  NNE of the district administrative center of Verkh-Usugli. It lies on the left bank of the Karenga river, to the southeast of the slopes of the Yablonoi Mountains.

History
Tungokochen was founded in the 1930s as the capital of Tungokochensky District. In 1976, the administrative center was moved to the village of Verkh-Usugli. The village had an airport which was functional until the 1990s.

See also
Kontalaksky Golets

References

Rural localities in Zabaykalsky Krai